Edward Phillips Birchall (July 16, 1923 – July 3, 1988) was known to generations of Oklahomans as HO-HO the Clown.

Biography 
Birchall was born on July 16, 1923 of Irish heritage in Colchester, Connecticut and served in the United States Army Air Forces during World War II. A lover of the circus, he performed as a freelance clown before being hired as an entertainer by KOCO-TV in Oklahoma City.  There, he starred in a local children's television show named after him, which typically featured an array of firefighters, police officers, zoo animals, visiting circus clowns, and other guests, as well as Pokey the Puppet, played by Bill Howard, the station's long-time stage manager wearing a sock-puppet on his arm. HoHo was all over the TV schedule, for much of the 1960s he was on six days a week. Various titles were "HoHo's Showboat", "Lunch With HoHo", "Good Morning HoHo", and "HoHo's Showplace".

The show survived for 29 years, long after the station was acquired by Gannett, airing in its last years without commercials to fulfill the station's public service requirements. He was a frequent visitor to children's wards at local hospitals, providing a kind of medicine the doctors could not. He also appeared at restaurants, charity events, parades, and children's parties, from which he derived most of his income.

Mr. Birchall was a diminutive and slightly round man of cheerful spirit and hippie inclinations. Friends remember him as behaving much the same in real life as on his show. He lived in Bethany, Oklahoma for most of his life, and suffered declining health leading to his death in the hospital on July 3, 1988 from a heart attack while undergoing treatment for cancer. His popularity was so great that it took three funeral services to accommodate all of his well-wishers, the first of which was attended by an honor guard of professional clown friends and carried live by KOCO-TV.

References

External links
 
 
 
 Ho-Ho the Clown - The greatest entertainer I ever saw

American clowns
1923 births
1988 deaths
United States Army Air Forces soldiers
United States Army Air Forces personnel of World War II